"Remember Me" is a song from the 2017 animated Pixar film Coco, written by Robert Lopez and Kristen Anderson-Lopez. The song is performed variously within the film by Benjamin Bratt, Gael García Bernal, Anthony Gonzalez, and Ana Ofelia Murguía. Miguel and Natalia Lafourcade perform a pop version of the song that is featured in the film's end credits. Carlos Rivera recorded a cover version of the song, titled "Recuérdame" for the film's Spanish-language soundtrack album. It won Best Original Song at the 90th Academy Awards in 2018.

This song was featured in ABC's 2020 television special The Disney Family Singalong: Volume II.

Context 

The song is used in a variety of contexts throughout the film. It is known as Ernesto de la Cruz's (Benjamin Bratt) most popular song written by his music partner Héctor Rivera (Gael García Bernal), and is first introduced in a mariachi arrangement, as a plea from Ernesto to his fans to keep him in their minds even as he tours in other places. It then appears as a lullaby from Héctor to his daughter Coco (which reveals that song was written for her), when he has to travel far as a traveling artist. It is then used as a nostalgic song to connect an older Coco (Ana Ofelia Murguía) to an earlier time in her life and to reunite Miguel (Anthony Gonzalez) with his great-grandmother. It then appears in a pop version played during the end credits, sung by singers Miguel and Natalia Lafourcade.

The piece is the "tie that binds multiple generations in the shared love of music".

Production 
Frozen team Kristen Anderson-Lopez and Robert Lopez were hired for the project. Director Lee Unkrich had admired them since they wrote Finding Nemo – The Musical in 2006. The film developed into a musical, but not a "break-into-song" type. A challenge with the song was in crafting lyrics that would pivot in meaning depending on the context in which they were sung. The team researched popular Mexican music, and wanted to write a song that could have been sung by Jorge Negrete or Pedro Infante. They wrote it as a bolero-ranchero style song, knowing that it could also work if performed as a quiet ballad. Robert wrote the music, and Kristen wrote the lyrics. She wanted to explore the idea of remembering people when they are far away, and explained "the power of music to bring people back to life, literally and figuratively".

Accolades 
"Remember Me" won the Academy Award for Best Original Song (with this win, composer Robert Lopez becomes the first ever double EGOT winner). The song also won the Critics' Choice Movie Award for Best Song and was nominated for the Golden Globe Award for Best Original Song and the Grammy Award for Best Song Written for Visual Media.

Certifications

References

External links
 Deadline article

2017 songs
2017 singles
2010s ballads
Pixar songs
Songs written by Robert Lopez
Songs written by Kristen Anderson-Lopez
Songs about death
Miguel (singer) songs
Natalia Lafourcade songs
Best Original Song Academy Award-winning songs
Walt Disney Records singles